Choi Jin-ri (March 29, 1994 – October 13 or 14, 2019), better known by her stage name Sulli, was a South Korean actress and singer. She first made her debut as a child actress, appearing as a supporting cast member on the SBS historical drama Ballad of Seodong (2005). Following this, she earned a number of guest roles, appearing in the television series Love Needs a Miracle (2005) and Drama City (2007), and the film Vacation (2006). She then subsequently appeared in the independent films Punch Lady (2007) and BA:BO (2008), the former being her first time cast in a substantial dramatic role.

After signing a record deal with SM Entertainment, Sulli rose to prominence as a member of the girl group f(x) formed in 2009. The group achieved both critical and commercial success, with four Korean number-one singles and international recognition after becoming the first K-pop act to perform at SXSW. Concurrently with her music career, Sulli returned to acting by starring in the SBS romantic comedy series, To the Beautiful You (2012), a Korean adaptation of the  Hana-Kimi where her performance was positively received and earned her two SBS Drama Awards and a nomination at the 49th Paeksang Arts Awards.

Sulli's film career progressed with her starring in the fantasy swashbuckler The Pirates (2014) and the coming-of-age drama Fashion King (2014). During the press tour for The Pirates, Sulli took a hiatus from the entertainment industry due to health issues and following a year long absence from promoting with f(x), she left the group in August 2015. Between 2015 and 2017, she embarked on a number of modelling campaigns before becoming an endorsement model for Estée Lauder. Sulli garnered attention for her role in the experimental neo-noir thriller Real (2017). She later returned to the music industry in 2018, making a guest appearance on Dean's single "Dayfly" and releasing her debut solo single "Goblin" in June 2019, which was her last musical project prior to her death.

Sulli was recognized as a prominent figure in Korean popular culture for her outspoken persona, becoming the most Googled person in South Korea in 2017, ahead of then-President of South Korea Moon Jae-in, and former President of South Korea Park Geun-hye, who was impeached that year.

Early life 
Sulli was born on March 29, 1994, in Busan, South Korea. Aspiring to be an actress, Sulli attended Jungbu Elementary School before moving to Seoul by herself in 2004, while in fourth grade, in order to attend the Seoul branch of the MTM Academy, a part-time theatre school where she studied singing, dancing, and acting. She had previously been enrolled in another acting school by her mother at a young age. Prior to her debut as a child actress and following her signing to SM Entertainment, her stage name was changed from Choi Jin-ri; which means "the truth" in Korean, to Sulli at the suggestion of a reporter who felt her birth name was "too Christian" and that people from other religions would not like it. In one interview, she interpreted her stage name to mean "pear blossoms in the snow".

Career

2005–2008: Career beginnings 
In 2005, Sulli began acting professionally at the age of 11, when she was selected to play young Princess Seonhwa of Silla in the SBS drama Ballad of Seodong. She continued to take on minor roles in television dramas and movies such as Vacation (2006), Punch Lady (2007), The Flower Girl is Here (2007) and BABO (2008).

When Sulli was in fourth grade, she attended an SM Entertainment audition, during which she sang the S.E.S. song titled Chingu ("Friend"). After the audition she was officially cast as an S.M. trainee and during the same year, moved into a dormitory with Taeyeon and Tiffany of Girls' Generation. She continued to stay there up until the debut of Girls' Generation, in 2007.

2009–2017: Debut with f(x), hiatus, and continued acting career 

On September 5, 2009, she debuted as a member of the group f(x), with the single "La Cha Ta".

In August 2012, Sulli starred as the lead role in To the Beautiful You, based on the famous Japanese shōjo manga series Hanazakari no Kimitachie. The drama series started broadcasting on August 15, 2012, on SBS. Sulli plays Gu Jae-hee, who disguises as a boy in order to attend the same school as her crush. In order to prepare for her role, Sulli who was known for her long hair cut 60 cm of it. She later won the New Star Award at the SBS Drama Awards for her performance in the drama.

In 2013, Sulli and group mate Krystal Jung became the new faces of the makeup brand, Etude House. In the midst of Red Light promotions, on July 24, 2014, SM Entertainment announced that Sulli decided to take a break from the South Korean entertainment industry due to being mentally and physically exhausted from the continuous malicious comments and rumors of her dating Dynamic Duo rapper Choiza, which was not confirmed at the time, and false rumors of her being pregnant.  Moreover, due to her hiatus, she did not participate in the promotion of the 2014 period adventure film The Pirates alongside Son Ye-jin and Kim Nam-gil, where she played a supporting character named Heuk-myo, a young girl who became a pirate after being saved by the female captain. However, later that same year, she resumed her acting career by attending the promotion of the 2014 comedy film Fashion King, based on the webtoon series of the same name, where she played a leading role alongside Joo Won and Kim Sung-oh. In August 2015, a year into her hiatus, SM Entertainment announced that Sulli had officially withdrawn from the group. 

Between 2015 and 2017, Sulli took part in modelling for various campaigns including for Estée Lauder as an endorsement model. In 2017, Sulli starred in a leading role in the film Real with Kim Soo-hyun as Song Yoo-hwa, a rehabilitation therapist at the hospital which Kim's character frequents. The film was released in June of that year.

2018–2019: Solo career and final projects 
Sulli was a featured singer in Dean's single "Dayfly", which was released on November 9, 2018, and served as her first release since leaving f(x) in 2015. On June 29, 2019, Sulli made her debut as a solo artist with the single album "Goblin", on which she co-wrote and co-produced all of the tracks, and held a special stage Peaches Go!blin on the same day at SM Town Theater.

In 2019, Sulli joined the JTBC2 variety program The Night of Hate Comments, which discussed celebrity's reactions to hateful comments, malicious rumors and cyberbullying they had encountered online. On the first episode, during Sulli's turn, she responded cheerfully to the mean spirited comments, a demeanor that gained her a label on the show, “the nuclear bomb of hate comments". She agreed with a commenter that said her biggest success is her social presence on SNS and that she is an attention seeker. She disagreed with a commenter who said she looked like a "druggie" because of her large dilated pupils, saying that she has done nothing illegal, but had studied drug behavior during method acting for her film Real. And she denied going braless to seek attention, saying that for her it was more comfortable, as well as "more natural and prettier", and that she sees bras as an accessory that she sometimes wears. She said, “I wish people would look at me and think, ‘Well, someone like that exists!' Accept the difference". While discussing past malicious comments she had received, she said she had started to sue once, but the commenter, a student at a prestigious college, had sent a long letter of apology, and she had forgiven them. However, she said she would not do the same again. On October 14, 2019, the cast and producers recorded another episode, per a Monday scheduling, unaware of Sulli's death, which was reported later in the day.

Sulli was cast as the main lead in the second season of the omnibus Netflix series Persona. On October 23, 2019, Mystic Story revealed they have decided to temporarily suspend production, as Sulli was in the midst of filming the second out of five planned episodes for the series when she died.

Public image

Following her departure from f(x), Sulli received renewed press attention for her unconventional persona which polarized public reception. Some members of the media branded her as "eccentric" and "forward-thinking", while conservative media outlets considered her to be "inappropriate" and "absurd". Sulli's persona has been parodied on Saturday Night Live Korea. A number of media outlets attributed the backlash against Sulli to the fact that her public image was not as carefully constructed as many of her contemporaries in the idol industry were, and she directly challenged societal expectations of women in Korean culture. The Associated Press described Sulli as someone who "was known for her feminist voice and outspokenness that was rare among female entertainers in deeply conservative South Korea."

On August 14, 2018, Sulli expressed support for Comfort Women Day, a national memorial day to honor the victims of sexual slavery during World War II by the Japanese Imperial Army. Additionally, Sulli proclaimed that she was an advocate for the no bra movement, having previously been criticized for going braless on several social media posts.

Sulli, in real life, spoke out against cyberbullying, which affected her personally as she was often the target of online abuse for her dichotomous  public image. She expressed her hope that people could accept each other's differences and said, "there are so many unique types of people in this country with so much talent and I feel like they're wasting it by putting their energy into critiquing others like this online." Following her appearance on the JTBC2 variety program The Night of Hate Comments, Billboard K-Town's Jeff Benjamin expressed that Sulli's appearance on the show seemed to reflect her controversial lifestyle. He said that, "as the youngest and most outspoken host", she talked about many personal topics, including "her pregnancy rumors, family plans, dating preferences and more."

Sulli was an artist, with one of her drawings (captioned “Portrait”) being the inspiration for IU's song “Red Queen” from her 2015 Chat-Shire album. Sulli was also the inspiration for IU's song "Peach".

Personal life 
Between September 2013 and March 2017, Sulli dated Dynamic Duo rapper Choiza, during which both celebrities endured malicious comments and cyberbullying throughout their public relationship.

In October 2018, Sulli revealed that she had struggled with panic disorder and social phobia since she was young. Prior to her death, Sulli was suffering from severe depression.

Death and impact

News leaked by an employee in the emergency response center revealed that on October 14, 2019, at approximately 3:20 p.m. KST, Sulli was found dead by her brother, who was also her manager, after hanging herself in the second floor in her house in Seongnam, south of Seoul. The manager reportedly visited the house when he was not able to reach her, after speaking with Sulli via phone the previous day at 6:30 p.m. KST. Police stated that they were investigating it as a possible suicide as there were no signs of foul play or a break-in. They found a handwritten note in her diary in which she described her feelings, but concluded that it was not a suicide note. On October 15, police filed for an autopsy to confirm the cause of death and performed it the following morning, concluding that her body did not show any signs of death due to external force, and it is likely a suicide that occurred on the night of October 13 or the morning of October 14.

The funeral was initially closed to the media as well as fans and was privately held by family members and friends. However, SM Entertainment opened a separate venue in Severance Hospital's funeral hall in Sinchon-dong, Seoul on October 15 and 16 for fans wishing to pay tribute. Various celebrities and companies, such as previous bandmates Krystal, Victoria Song, Amber Liu and Luna, fellow singer and friend IU, Dynamic Duo, and the premiere of the film Gift, canceled their activities to mourn Sulli. On October 17, following a four-day private funeral and mourning ceremony at a Seoul hospital, Sulli was buried at an undisclosed location.

Sulli's death was linked by various media outlets to depression caused by cyberbullying. Following her death, it was revealed that Sulli had repeatedly asked her agency, SM Entertainment, to take strong measures against the malicious comments and cyberbullying. A total of seven petitions were posted at the South Korean presidential office website demanding tougher punishment for cyberbullying and strengthening use of the real-name system when posting comments and creating accounts. Moreover, the political circle discussed various ways to prevent such a tragedy from happening again. An act under the proposed title "Sulli Act" was mentioned at a general audit of the Korea Communications Commission on October 21, where Rep.  of the Liberty Korea Party said he is writing a legislative proposal to enact a new law to increase the responsibility of comments by introducing an Internet real-name system. Moreover, on October 25, Rep.  proposed a partial amendment to the Act on Promotion of Information and Communications Network Utilization and Information Protection, which imposes an obligation for information and communication service providers to delete hate comments. In addition, the amendment included marking malicious comments as illegal information, and provide anyone who saw malicious comments, not just the one being attacked, the ability to request its deletion. On the same day, Rep. Park Dae-chool also proposed an amendment to the Act on Promotion of Information and Communications Network Utilization and Information Protection which would allow the disclosure of full names of people posting comments under usernames and strengthen accountability of online comments by disclosing IPs. On October 25, 2019, Kakao announced that they are temporarily disabling comments on entertainment news to prevent hate comments and removing related search terms when searching people's names for a year.

Following her death, "Love You Sulli" started trending in an attempt by fans to hide negative search results. IU's song "Peach", which was written about Sulli, re-entered music charts. Goo Hara, who was Sulli's close friend, died by suicide a month after Sulli's death.

Discography

Singles

Songwriting and composing credits

Filmography

Film

Television series

Variety shows

Awards and nominations

Notes

References

External links

 
 

1994 births
2019 deaths
F(x) (group) members
Japanese-language singers of South Korea
People from Busan
People from South Gyeongsang Province
School of Performing Arts Seoul alumni
SM Entertainment artists
South Korean child actresses
South Korean child singers
South Korean film actresses
South Korean female idols
South Korean female models
South Korean women pop singers
South Korean songwriters
South Korean television actresses
Victims of cyberbullying
Suicides by hanging in South Korea
2019 suicides
21st-century South Korean actresses
21st-century South Korean women singers
Female suicides